Euphorbia zoutpansbergensis is a species of plant in the family Euphorbiaceae. It is endemic to the northern provinces of South Africa.

References

zoutpansbergensis
Flora of the Northern Provinces
Endemic flora of South Africa
Near threatened plants
Taxonomy articles created by Polbot